Local elections were held in the Mexican State of Baja California on Sunday, August 5, 2007. According to the preliminary results program, José Guadalupe Osuna Millán of the Alliance for Baja California (APBC) was elected governor by a 7% margin over candidate Jorge Hank Rohn of the Alliance for a Better Life (APVM). Results for APBC in municipalities and congressional seats were better than expected including victory for mayor of Tijuana which Jorge Hank Rohn's occupied previous to the electoral campaign.

The ruling party (National Action Party) had attempted to move the date to June as part of an electoral reform, but the Supreme Court determined that such reforms were "a serious violation to the legislative process" since the reforms were approved with "no previous discussion and analysis". Also, the local council members belonging to the PAN voted against granting permission to Jorge Hank from leaving his post as municipal president and accepting a nomination as candidate for the Institutional Revolutionary Party the same day the State Electoral Institute rejected the PAN's petition to form an electoral alliance. The Party of the Democratic Revolution did not reach an agreement to form an alliance with the Labor Party and Convergence

Voters will go to the polls to elect, on the local level:
A new Governor of Baja California to serve for a six-year term.
Five municipal presidents (mayors) to serve for a three-year term.
25 local deputies (16 by the first-past-the-post system and nine by proportional representation) to serve for a three-year term in the Congress of Baja California.

Gubernatorial election
Ten political parties will participate in the 2007 Baja California State election.

Official results

Source: IEEBC website

Preliminary results

Source: PREP

Municipal election
The five municipalities will choose their municipal president.

Ensenada

Source: PREP

Mexicali

Source: PREP

Playas de Rosarito

Source: PREP

Tecate

Source: PREP

Tijuana

Source: IEE Baja California

Congressional election
All electoral districts will choose their deputy in the 2007 Baja California State election.

Post-election controversies
After the election the PRI-led Alliance for a Better Life appealed to the state court to invalidate the election. The organization followed its request with protests.

See also
2007 Mexican elections
2013 Mexican states elections

References

External links
Electoral Institute of Baja California website 

2007 elections in Mexico
Election